The Zentrum für Astronomie der Universität Heidelberg (Center for Astronomy of Heidelberg University) in Heidelberg, Germany, founded in 2005, is an association of three, formerly state-run research institutes: the Astronomisches Rechen-Institut, the Institut für Theoretische Astrophysik (Institute for Theoretical Astrophysics) and the Landessternwarte Heidelberg-Königstuhl (Heidelberg-Königstuhl State Observatory).

External links
 Homepage of the Center for Astronomy

Heidelberg University
Astronomy institutes and departments
Research institutes in Germany
Astrophysics institutes
2005 establishments in Germany